Monika Reneé Hoffman (11 March 1982) is a Swedish-Hungarian singer and songwriter from Malmö, Sweden

Monika Hoffman's was born in Malmö. Her father is Swedish and her mother is Hungarian, so she grew up speaking fluent Hungarian, Swedish, and English. At the age of three she began playing the  violin and  later on she also began playing the piano and the saxophone. As a child and teenager, she went to various music schools and later went on to study at Berklee College of Music. She was granted the Berklee College of Music World Tour Scholarship and got the opportunity to share the stage with people like Michael Brecker and Charlie Hayden.

In 2005, she auditioned for the Hungarian Megasztar (Idol) and was selected to be part of the final 12. In spite of only placing ninth overall, she became one of the most popular and successful contestants from that season, kickstarting her career as a singer in Hungary. It resulted in two studio albums, the pop oriented "Én vagyok a nő" (I'm the woman), followed by the jazz album "Monika Hoffman And The Scandinavian Knights". The latter one featured one of Hungary’s best jazz-pianists, Róbert Lakatos.

Monika Hoffman has twice competed in the Hungarian preselection for the Eurovision Song Contest. In 2008 with the song "Légy te az első" and in 2013 with the song "Hullócsillag".

Discography

Studio albums

Én vagyok a nö
Monika Hoffman And The Scandinavian Knights
Let's Run Away featuring Paquito D'Rivera
Snowbound

References

Swedish pop singers
Swedish people of Hungarian descent
Swedish composers
21st-century Hungarian women singers
Hungarian pop singers
Hungarian people of Swedish descent
Hungarian composers
Living people
Singers from Malmö
1982 births
21st-century Swedish women singers